Jacqui Cowderoy (born 29 December 1961) is a former Australian alpine skier who competed
at the 1980 Winter Olympics. She came 17th out of 19 competitors in the slalom and was disqualified in the giant slalom.

References

Living people
1961 births
Olympic alpine skiers of Australia
Alpine skiers at the 1980 Winter Olympics
Australian female alpine skiers